KUUsport Manufacturing is a Toronto based Canadian company producing ski wax and related ski tuning equipment. The name is derived from Ron Kuus, the founder. The company was incorporated in 1986.
KUU is an official supplier to Canadian and Austrian ski teams.

A spin-off product was featured on the Canadian version of Dragons' Den.

References

External links
KUU website
Official Supplier to the Ontario Alpine Ski Team.
2003 deal with USSA
Monodsports
product featured on Dragon's Den (Canada)
product featured on Dragon's Den (Canada)
Mosquito Shield spin-off product
Profile Canada

Companies established in 1986
Ski equipment manufacturers
Manufacturing companies based in Toronto
Sporting goods manufacturers of Canada
1986 establishments in Ontario